Belén is a district of the Carrillo canton, in the Guanacaste province of Costa Rica.

Toponymy

History 
Belén was created on 16 June 1877 by Decreto 22. Segregated from Santa Cruz canton. The present church was built in 1969 and the park was built in the period 1974-1978.

Geography 
Belén has an area of  km² and an elevation of  metres.

Villages
Administrative center of the district is the village of Belén.

Other villages in the district are Alto San Antonio, Cachimbo, Castilla de Oro, Coyolito, Gallina, Juanilama, Loma Bonita, Llano, Ojochal, Palestina, Palmas, Paraíso, Penca, Planes, Poroporo, Río Cañas Nuevo, Santa Ana, Santo Domingo.

Demographics 

For the 2011 census, Belén had a population of  inhabitants.

Transportation

Road transportation 
The district is covered by the following road routes:
 National Route 21
 National Route 155

References 

Districts of Guanacaste Province
Populated places in Guanacaste Province